Michal Hrazdílek (born 28 June 1995) is a Slovak football midfielder who currently plays for NAFC Velke Blahovo.

Club career
He made his debut for DAC Dunajská Streda on 29 November 2013 against FC Nitra, entering in as a substitute in place of Petr Hošek in the 76 minute of the game.

External links
Futbalnet profile
Slovan Bratislava profile

References

1995 births
Living people
Slovak footballers
Association football midfielders
FC DAC 1904 Dunajská Streda players
Slovak Super Liga players
Footballers from Bratislava